The Queen Stakes (Japanese クイーンステークス) is a Grade 3 horse race for Thoroughbred fillies and mares aged three and over, run in late July or early August over a distance of 1800 metres on turf at Sapporo Racecourse.

The Queen Stakes was first run in 1953 and has held Grade 3 status since 1984. The distance of the race was originally 2000 metres but was reduced to 1800 metres in 1996. The race was usually run at either Tokyo Racecourse or Nakayama Racecourse before moving to its current venue in 2000.

Winners since 2000

Earlier winners

 1984 - Happy Uroton
 1985 - Asakusa Scale
 1986 - Royal Silky
 1987 - Strong Lady
 1988 - Free Talk
 1989 - Mejiro Monterey
 1990 - Winners Gold
 1991 - Inazuma Cross
 1992 - Shinko Lovely
 1993 - Yukino Bijin
 1994 - Hishi Amazon
 1995 - Sakura Candle
 1996 - Rainbow Queen
 1997 - Promotion
 1998 - Air Deja Vu
 1999 - Air Zion

See also
 Horse racing in Japan
 List of Japanese flat horse races

References

Turf races in Japan